The 1988 Britannic Assurance County Championship was the 89th officially organised running of the County Championship. Worcestershire won the Championship title. Matches played over four days were introduced to the competition this season. Each county was scheduled to play sixteen three-day matches, one against each other county, and six four-day matches. The four-day matches were played at the start and end of the season. This resulted in a total of twenty-two games for each county, a decrease of two from the number played in 1987.

Table
16 points for a win
8 points to each side for a tie
8 points to side still batting in a match in which scores finish level
Bonus points awarded in the first 100 overs of the first innings
Batting: 150 runs - 1 point, 200 runs - 2 points 250 runs - 3 points, 300 runs - 4 points
Bowling: 3-4 wickets - 1 point, 5-6 wickets - 2 points 7-8 wickets - 3 points, 9-10 wickets - 4 points
No bonus points awarded in a match starting with less than 8 hours' play remaining. A one-innings match is played, with the winner gaining 12 points.
Position determined by points gained. If equal, then decided on most wins.

References

County Championship
County Championship seasons